"Hylarana" margariana,  commonly known as the Irrawaddy frog, is a species of true frog in the family Ranidae. It is native to Myanmar and may be present in China.

References

margariana
Amphibians of Myanmar
Endemic fauna of Myanmar
Amphibians described in 1879